"My Love" is a song by British singer Kele Le Roc. It was released as a single on 15 March 1999 as the second single from her debut album, Everybody's Somebody. Like her previous single "Little Bit of Lovin'", the song peaked at  8 on the UK Singles Chart, and it also peaked at No. 48 in New Zealand in January 2001. In 1999, the song won a MOBO Award for Best Single. Several remixes of the song became underground hits in the UK.

Remixes
Two garage remixes by 10º Below were underground hits in the UK garage scene in 1999: the 10º Below Vocal Mix and 10º Below Dub Mix. In 2008, a new set of remixes was released on Ice Cream Records titled "My Love (So Good)", featuring mixes by 10º Below, J-Sweet, and X-Men. The Paul Masterson remix was a hit on the London club scene in the early 2000s.

In 2018, the House & Garage Orchestra together with Le Roc recorded an orchestral version of the 10° Below Vocal Mix for the UK garage covers album Garage Classics.

Impact and legacy
"My Love" won the MOBO Award for Best Single in 1999. In November 2016, UK duo Gorgon City compiled a list of their top UK garage songs for Billboard, with "My Love (10º Below Mix)" at No. 17. In September 2019, NME included the 10º Below Mix of "My Love" in their "25 essential UK garage anthems" list. Mixmag included the 10º Below Mix of "My Love" in their list of "16 of the Best Uplifting Vocal Garage Tracks". Capital Xtra included the 10º Below Mix in their list of "The Best Old-School Garage Anthems of All Time".

Track listings
UK CD1
 "My Love" (7-inch Rude Boy edit) – 3:53
 "Forlorn – 5:03
 "Little Bit of Lovin'" (live from the Criterion) – 3:37

UK CD2 (The Mixes)
 "My Love" (7-inch Rude Boy edit) – 3:56
 "My Love" (Ignorants edit) – 3:43
 "My Love" (M!s Lush vocal edit) – 4:12
 "My Love" (Paul Masterson club mix) – 7:33

UK cassette single
 "My Love" (7-inch Rude Boy edit) – 3:56
 "Forlorn – 5:03

Charts

Weekly charts

Year-end charts

References

1998 songs
1999 singles
Kele Le Roc songs
Polydor Records singles
First Avenue Records singles
Songs written by Robbie Nevil
UK garage songs